Huang Kaixiang (born 15 January 1996) is a Chinese badminton player. He joined the China national badminton team in 2012, as his games at the China Badminton Super League attracted the attention of national-team coach Li Yongbo. At the BWF World Junior Championships, he won two gold medals in the mixed doubles event partnered with Chen Qingchen in 2013 and 2014 and one silver medal in the boys' doubles event partnered with Zheng Siwei in 2013. In the mixed team event he won gold in 2014 and bronze in 2013.

Achievements

Asian Championships 
Men's doubles

BWF World Junior Championships 
Boys' doubles

Mixed doubles

Asian Junior Championships 
Boys' doubles

Mixed doubles

BWF World Tour (2 runners-up) 
The BWF World Tour, which was announced on 19 March 2017 and implemented in 2018, is a series of elite badminton tournaments sanctioned by the Badminton World Federation (BWF). The BWF World Tour is divided into levels of World Tour Finals, Super 1000, Super 750, Super 500, Super 300 (part of the HSBC World Tour), and the BWF Tour Super 100.

Men's doubles

BWF Grand Prix (5 titles, 4 runners-up) 
The BWF Grand Prix had two levels, the Grand Prix and Grand Prix Gold. It was a series of badminton tournaments sanctioned by the Badminton World Federation (BWF) and played between 2007 and 2017.

Men's doubles

Mixed doubles

  BWF Grand Prix Gold tournament
  BWF Grand Prix tournament

References

External links 
 

1996 births
Living people
People from Nanping
Badminton players from Fujian
Chinese male badminton players